William Arthur Karns (December 28, 1875 – November 15, 1941) was a Major League Baseball pitcher. In 3 career games, he had a 1–0 record, with a 6.35 ERA. He batted and threw left-handed.

Karns was born in Richmond, Iowa, and died in Seattle, Washington.

External links

1875 births
1941 deaths
Baltimore Orioles (1901–02) players
Major League Baseball pitchers
Baseball players from Iowa
Fall River Indians players
Hartford Senators players
Meriden Silverites players